Bromeswell is a village and civil parish in the East Suffolk district of Suffolk, England about 2 miles east of Woodbridge.

Situated near the River Deben, Bromeswell lies on fairly high and fertile ground with low-lying heathland to the South and marshland to the West.

A mile to the south west is Sutton Hoo, the Ango-Saxon burial site situated alongside the River Deben.

The parish church of Bromeswell is situated in what is considered the centre of the village. The church has roots from several centuries ago, with a tower to the West, a vestry to the North and a South porch. The church consists of various additional features from various centuries.

Bromeswell lacks most public amenities but has a bus stop, post box and traditional village inn, the Unruly Pig.

References

External links

 St Edmund, Bromeswell: Information
 Bromeswell Cherry Tree

Villages in Suffolk
Civil parishes in Suffolk